Maliha Masood was born 1972 in Karachi, Pakistan. She moved to the United States in 1982 and grew up in Seattle, WA. Maliha is a writer in creative nonfiction and the author of two travel memoirs, Zaatar Days, Henna Nights (Seal Press/2007). and Dizzy In Karachi (Booktrope Editions/2013).

Fluent in Urdu and French, Maliha studied International Business at the University of Washington and worked as a research analyst in the IT sector for six years before turning towards writing.

Selected for the Jack Straw Foundation writers forum in 2005, Masood's writings on women, culture and Islam have been featured in Al-Ahram Weekly, Asia Times and the anthologies Voices of Resistance: Muslim Women on War, Faith and Sexuality, Waking up American and Bare your Soul: A Thinking Girl's Guide to Spirituality.

Maliha also appeared in and co-wrote a documentary film, Nazrah: A Muslim Woman's Perspective 
 that aired on PBS. She was featured on the show Travel with Rick Steves  on NPR.

In addition to writing, Maliha is a passionate and engaging teacher. She was a resident artist with Seattle Arts and Lectures Writers in the Schools Program  during 2007 and a guest instructor in the Political Science Department at Edmonds Community College in the spring of 2009. Maliha also provides workshops and seminars through her nonprofit collective, The Diwaan Project, a grassroots initiative on global affairs. She did her graduate studies at the Fletcher School at Tufts University and Harvard, earning a master's degree in Law and Diplomacy in May 2004.

Maliha briefly worked in Pakistan at the International Crisis Group and the Human Rights Commission before moving back to the Pacific Northwest. She lives and writes in Kirkland, Washington.

References

External links 
 http://stephanieelizondogriest.com/dizzy-in-karachi/
 http://stephanieelizondogriest.com/interview-with-maliha-masood/
 http://www.perceptivetravel.com/issues/0409/khyber_pass.html
 http://www.wanderingeducators.com/books-film/books/zaatar-days-henna-nights.html
 http://www.turkeytravelplanner.com/resources/books/adventure/zaatar_days.html
 https://archive.today/20130628203342/http://www.budgettravel.com/print/846/
 http://www.girlgetaways.com/articles/2009spring/bemyguest_seattle.html
 http://www.jackstraw.org/programs/writers/WritersForum/05/interviews/maliha.htmlz
 http://www2.kuow.org/program.php?id=12391
 http://travelwriting2.com/an-interview-with-maliha-masood/
 http://seattletimes.com/html/faithvalues/2003703774_masood12.html?syndication=rss
 https://www.facebook.com/dizzyinkarachi
 http://www.goodreads.com/author/show/457609.Maliha_Masood
 https://twitter.com/Maliha_Masood

Living people
1972 births
American travel writers
Pakistani emigrants to the United States
Writers from Kirkland, Washington
University of Washington alumni
Harvard University alumni
The Fletcher School at Tufts University alumni
Writers from Seattle
American women travel writers
21st-century American women